Everything You Want is the debut studio album by American R&B singer Ray J. It was released by EastWest Records on 	March 25, 1997 in the United States.

Critical reception

Allmusic rated the album one and a half stars out of five.

Chart performance
Everything You Want sold under 100,000 copies to date while it failed to reach the US Billboard 200, it peaked at number 56 on the Top R&B/Hip-Hop Albums chart.

Track listing

Charts

References

1997 debut albums
Ray J albums